Alipur Sayadan Sharif railway station is located in Alipur Syedan town, Narowal district, Punjab province, Pakistan.

See also
 List of railway stations in Pakistan
 Pakistan Railways

References

Railway stations in Narowal district
Railway stations on Wazirabad–Narowal Branch Line